Beuttler & Arnold was an architectural firm in Sioux City, Iowa that designed several works that are listed on the National Register of Historic Places for their architecture.

William Buettler (1883-1963) and Ralph Arnold (1889-1961) both worked for architect Wilfred W. Beach in Sioux City.  The two began their partnership in Sioux City in 1912, and dissolved it when the advent of World War II stopped almost all non-military construction.

Works include:
Florence Crittenton Home and Maternity Hospital (1913), 1105-1111 28th St. Sioux City, Iowa, NRHP-listed
Hartington Carnegie Library (1914–15), 106 S Broadway, Hartington, Nebraska
Trimble Block (1915), 6th & Pierce, Sioux City, Iowa
Sachse, Bunn & Company Block (1920; Colonial Revival), 201 S. 5th St., Sioux City, Iowa, a contributing building in the Cherokee Commercial Historic District
Sioux City Masonic Temple (1921–22; Spanish Colonial Revival), NRHP-listed
Le Mars Central High School, (1924, 1952 additions; Colonial Revival), 335 1st Ave., SW., Le Mars, Iowa, NRHP-listed
First Baptist Church of Vermillion (1925), 101 E. Main St. Vermillion, South Dakota, design of second wing (1925), adding to first wing designed by Wallace LeRoy Dow and built during 1889–90.
United States Post Office and Courthouse (1934; Moderne and Art Deco) 316-320 6th St., Sioux City, Iowa, NRHP-listed

Also the NRHP-listed Milo Public Library, at 4 Pleasant St., Milo, Maine, built in 1922, which has Frederick A. Paterson of Bangor recorded as its architect, is almost identical in design to Beuttler and Arnold's Hartington, Nebraska library.  Both appear generally to follow the Type F plan provided by James Bertram's Notes on Library Buildings (1910).  The Milo library's building committee inquired about, and may have purchased, Beuttler and Arnold's detailed plans.

References

External links
Beuttler & Arnold, Architects, within Place Makers of Nebraska: The Architects, edited by David Murphy, Edward F. Zimmer, and Lynn Meyer, part of the Nebraska State Historical Society's Encyclopedia of Nebraska History

Architecture firms based in Iowa
Sioux City, Iowa
American companies established in 1912
Defunct architecture firms of the United States
Year of disestablishment missing
Defunct companies based in Iowa
1912 establishments in Iowa